Fedor Zaytsev (born 1963) is a Russian mathematician, Professor, Dr.Sc., a professor at the Faculty of Computer Science at the Moscow State University.

He defended the thesis «Mathematical modeling of kinetic processes with Coulomb interaction in toroidal plasma» for the degree of Doctor of Physical and Mathematical Sciences (1997).

Author of 7 books and more than 150 scientific articles.

References

Bibliography

External links
 Annals of the Moscow University
 MSU CMC
 Scientific works of Fedor Zaytsev
 Scientific works of Fedor Zaytsev

Russian computer scientists
Russian mathematicians
Living people
1963 births
Academic staff of Moscow State University
Moscow State University alumni